St. Pius X Catholic High School is a private Catholic high school in Chamblee, DeKalb County, Georgia, near the city of Atlanta. It was founded by the Archdiocese of Atlanta in 1958.

Description
Annual tuition is $13,700 for active Catholics and $15,200 for non-active or non-Catholics. Financial aid ranging from 20% to 50% is available on a need basis. 50% is the maximum given to any student.

Athletics
St. Pius X currently has 25 main sports teams. St. Pius X fields 62 teams at junior varsity and varsity levels in most sports, with the larger programs fielding freshman teams. The school's colors are navy blue and Vegas gold, and their nickname is the Golden Lions. St. Pius X has won six Regions Director's Cups, including 2018–19 which ended the 19-year streak of Marist in AAAA.

As of the 2021–22 season.

Key:

Fall sports
The Football program has one state title in 1968, and three state runners-up in 1965, 2012, and 2014.  The team has made the state playoffs in 19 of the past 20 seasons.

The boys' cross country team has won 12 state titles, including nine since 2010. Both the boys' and girls' teams won the AAAA state title in 2019 and were All-Class State champions in 2020.

The volleyball team has two state championships in 2013 and 2018 and has five state runners-up finishes.

Softball won the state title in 1995 and was runners-up in 1998.

The Golden Lions have a competition cheer squad in addition to the spirit squads.

Winter sports

Both boys' and girls' swimming team's home pool is the Dynamo Swim Center just down the street from campus.  Boys' Swimming has claimed four state titles, including three straight in 2017–2019.  The girls' swim team has three state runners-up finishes in 2009, 2015, and 2019.

Both basketball teams won the region title in 2020.  The boys' team has three state runners-up finishes in 1992, 2017, 2018.  The girls' team has five state championships including 2004, 2006, 2007, 2013, and 2014 

The wrestling program had five wrestlers place at the state tournament in 2020.

The dance team performs at halftime during basketball games and practices during the week.

Spring sports
The boys' soccer team produced US World Cup player Ricardo Clark, who currently plays for Eintracht Frankfurt in addition to the U.S. National Team, and Andrew Wolverton, who currently plays for LA Galaxy and was a part of the 2011 FAB 50 National Championship team.  The men's program has 12 state titles including a run of four straight from 2013 to 2016, and were named National Champions in 2011 and 2015 

The girls' soccer team has won twelve state crowns and won five straight from 2013 to 2017 and were named National champions in 2009.

Boys' golf won its first state championship in 2019, and has been runners-up three times.  The girls' golf team finished in the top 10 at the state championships in 2019.

Baseball has won three region championships and advanced to the state semifinals in 2013 

Boys' Track & Field has four state titles including back-to-back championships in 2018 and 2019.  Girls' track & field won a state crown in 2006 and has finished in second-place seven times.

The tennis programs have multiple state titles.  The boys' program has four state championships  and eight runners-up, and the girls' program has three state titles  and nine runners-up finishes.

Notable alumni

 Annie Anton, President's Commission on Enhancing National Cybersecurity
 Richard Armitage, Deputy Secretary of State under George W. Bush
 Gunnar Bentz, Olympic swimmer
 Kelley Cain, WNBA, Connecticut Sun
 Violet Chachki, Winner of RuPaul's Drag Race Season 7
 Ricardo Clark, midfielder, Eintracht Frankfurt, Houston Dynamo and U.S. National Soccer Team
 Kevin Cone, wide receiver, Winnipeg Blue Bombers
 Asia Durr, WNBA, New York Liberty
 Nick Rogers, former linebacker, Minnesota Vikings
 Jimmy Maurer, goalkeeper, FC Dallas

 Andrew Wolverton, goalkeeper, LA Galaxy

See also

National Catholic Educational Association

Notes and references

External links
 St. Pius X Catholic High School

Educational institutions established in 1958
Roman Catholic Archdiocese of Atlanta
Catholic secondary schools in Georgia (U.S. state)
1958 establishments in Georgia (U.S. state)
Chamblee, Georgia
Private high schools in DeKalb County, Georgia